SSMVHS School, also known as Seethi Sahib Memorial Vocational Higher Secondary School, formerly known as Edakazhiyoor SSMF VHSS, Edakazhiyoor, is a school for boys and girls located at Edakkazhiyoor in Chavakkad Taluk, Thrissur District, Kerala. It is the first school in the coastal area of Chavakkad and Punnayoor Panchayath.

Institution 
SSMVHSS has three departments. The student body includes 2,000 students and 200 faculty members. The school has laboratories and computer facilities and was the first school in the coastal area of Chavakkad and Punnayoor Panchayath.

The school is located at Edakkazhiyoor – a suburb town of the coastal city of Chavakkad on the NH-17 road.

The trust was founded by Janab Moidutty Sahib.

Programmes
High school
 Class VIII to X
Malayalam medium	
English medium

Higher Secondary
Science
Commerce
Humanities

VHSE
Medical Laboratory Technician
Computer Science
Computerise Office Management

See also 
ssmvhss official blog

Schools in Thrissur district